Newtown, West Virginia may refer to:
Newtown, Fayette County, West Virginia, an unincorporated community in Fayette County
Newtown, Mingo County, West Virginia, an unincorporated community in Mingo County

See also:
Newton, West Virginia